Kenya Wildlife Service is a state corporation under the Ministry of Tourism and Wildlife established by an act of Parliament; Wildlife Conservation and Management Act CAP 376, of 1989, now repealed and replaced by the Wildlife Conservation and Management Act, 2013. At independence, the Government of Kenya committed itself to conserving wildlife for posterity with all the means at its disposal, including the places animals lived, forests and water catchment areas.

Kenya Wildlife Service conserves and manages national parks, wildlife conservation areas, and sanctuaries under its jurisdiction.

History
In 1989 Richard Leakey was appointed the head of the Wildlife Conservation and Management Department (WMCD) by President Daniel Arap Moi in response to the international outcry over the poaching of elephants and the impact it was having on the wildlife of Kenya.

Well-armed anti-poaching units were formed and were authorized to shoot poachers on sight. The poaching menace was dramatically reduced. The transformation of the Kenya Wildlife Service got World Bank approved grants worth $140 million. Richard Leakey, President Moi, and the WMCD made the international news headlines when a stockpile of 12 tons of ivory was burned in 1989 in Nairobi National Park.

These successes saw David Western appointed to serve as Director of the Kenya Wildlife Service (KWS) by retired President Moi in 1994. Others who served as KWS Directors are:

 Brig. (Rtd) John Waweru
 Kitili Mbathi
 William Kiprono
 Julius Kipng'etich
 Michael Wamithi
 Nehemiah Rotich
 Joseph Kioko
 Evans Mukolwe

On 20 July 2011 Kenya’s President Mwai Kibaki set on fire nearly 5 tonnes of elephant ivory (335 tusks), with an estimated value of USD$16m.

On 30 April 2016, Kenyan President Uhuru Kenyatta set alight the largest ever pile of ivory for destruction in the Nairobi National Park. The pile consisted of 105 tonnes of elephant ivory from about 8,000 elephants and 1.35 tonnes of horns from 343 rhinoceroses. Estimates for the total black market value of the destroyed contraband range from $150 million to $220 million. The ivory was transported to the site in shipping containers then stacked into towers up to 10 ft (3.0 m) tall and 20 ft (6.1 m) in diameter. The ivory towers took personnel from the Kenya Wildlife Service ten days to build. The pyre also contained exotic animal skins. The amount of ivory destroyed equaled about 5% of the global stock. Gabonese President Ali Bongo Ondimba was also in attendance.

National parks and reserves
Kenya has over 39 designated national parks and reserves:

Aberdare National Park  
Amboseli National Park
Arabuko Sokoke National Reserve
Arawale National Reserve
Bisanadi National Reserve
Boni National Reserve
Central Island National Park
Chyulu Hills National Park
Dodori National Reserve
Hell's Gate National Park
Kakamega Forest Reserve
Kisite-Mpunguti Marine National Park
Kisumu Impala Sanctuary
Kora National Park
Lake Bogoria National Reserve
Lake Nakuru National Park
Losai National Reserve
Malindi Marine National Park
Malka Mari National Park
Marsabit National Reserve

Meru National Park
Mombasa Marine National Park and Reserve
Mount Elgon National Park
Mount Kenya National Park
Mount Longonot National Park
Mwea National Reserve
Nairobi National Park
Ndere Island National Reserve
Ol Donyo Sabuk National Park
Ruma National Park
Saiwa Swamp National Park
Samburu National Reserve
Shaba National Reserve
Shimba Hills National Reserve
Sibiloi National Park
Tana River Primate Reserve
Tsavo East National Park
Tsavo West National Park
Watamu Marine National Park

Conservation programmes
KWS runs specific programmes to assist Kenyan species and their habitats that are in particular danger. They have forest and Wetland conservation programmes, as well as specific elephant and rhino projects to help them recover from poaching. The hirola, which is in danger of extinction, is also being monitored.

Within KWS there are several services, each responsible for a different area of work:

Community Wildlife Service
This branch of the KWS works outside the national parks. They work instead in areas such as wildlife corridors, and teach the communities living there to encourage conservation and look after their resources.

Security Services
The job of this service is to eliminate poaching in the national parks and stop illegal trade. The Kenyan government has also erected fences which keeps the precious animals/wildlife inside the national park.

The Kenya wildlife service, through its rangers, offer extensive patrols and protection of the country’s wildlife in its wild spaces and as a result hundreds of rangers have lost their lives in the line of duty.

Veterinary Services
This service ensures that healthy breeding populations of species are maintained throughout the country.

Ranks

Training
KWS has a training institute, also referred to as Kenya Wildlife Service Training Institute. The facility located in Naivasha, is a middle-level college registered with the Ministry of Education, Science and Technology as a TVET institution. It offers specialized certificate and diploma courses in natural resource management, ecology and tourism in an effort to enhance conservation, management and sustainability of wildlife bio-diversity in Kenya and globally.

KWS also has a Law Enforcement Academy is situated in Manyani Area, which caters for all law enforcers' paramilitary training. Manyani area was established in 1990.

Education
KWS run several education centres:
Nairobi Safari Walk
Nairobi Education Centre
Lake Nakuru Education Centre
Tsavo East Education Centre
Tsavo West Education Centre
These are located inside National Parks, and run programs to encourage people to care for their environment. It is aimed at local people, particularly school groups, but is open to anyone.

Influential administrators 
 Dr. Erastus Kanga (Current Acting Director-General)
 Brig. (Rtd.) John M. Waweru, EBS 
 Julius Kipng'etich, former Director General (departed 2012)
 Ronald kipruto koech
 Michael Kipkeu
 Richard Leakey, Chairman of the Board of Trustees
 Kitili Mbathi, Director General (since 2016)

See also 
 List of national parks of Kenya

References

External links
 Kenya Wildlife Service

Wildlife conservation in Kenya
Environmental organisations based in Kenya
Wildlife
Government agencies established in 1990
1990 establishments in Kenya